Easthorpe may refer to one of these places in England:
Easthorpe, Essex
Easthorpe, Leicestershire
Easthorpe, Nottinghamshire
Easthorpe, North Yorkshire